Krasny Yar is a rural locality (a selo) in Zelyonopolyansky Selsoviet, Klyuchevsky District, Altai Krai, Russia. The population was 126 as of 2013. There are 2 streets.

References 

Rural localities in Klyuchevsky District